Dave Simmonds (25 October 1939 – 23 October 1972) was a British professional Grand Prix motorcycle road racer. He competed in the Grand Prix world championships from 1963 to 1972. Simmonds is notable for winning the 1969 125 cc FIM road racing world championship.

Motorcycle racing career
Born in London, Simmonds began his motorcycle racing career riding a 50cc Itom motorcycle in 1960. By 1963 he had won the 125cc British road racing national championship on a Tohatsu. His impressive results earned him an invitation from the Kawasaki factory to race one of their motorcycles in the Japanese Grand Prix. Simmonds convinced Kawasaki management to loan him a motorcycle to compete in the 125cc Grand Prix world championships. In an era of unrestricted rules, the  Kawasaki KR1 125cc twin cylinder was outclassed by the expensive, V4 engines used by the Yamaha racing team and the square four engines used by Suzuki. Without any financial or mechanical support from the Kawasaki factory, Simmonds spent the 1967 and 1968 Grand Prix seasons sorting out the motorcycle's reliability issues. 

In 1969, the FIM changed its regulations in an effort to reduce spiraling costs in motorcycle racing. 125cc and 250cc machines would be limited to two cylinders and 6-speed transmissions. This regulation change caused the dominant Yamaha and Suzuki factories to withdraw their teams from Grand Prix racing. Simmonds and his aging Kawasaki won the 1969 125cc road racing world championship in an impressive fashion with only one race in which he failed to finish in either first or second place. The victory marked the first world championship for Kawasaki.

Simmonds dropped to fourth place in 1970 with improved competition from Dieter Braun (Suzuki), Ángel Nieto (Derbi) and Börje Jansson (Maico) but, still managed to win the Finnish Grand Prix and scored two second place finishes in the Dutch and Belgian Grands Prix. Simmonds finished sixth in the 1971 125cc world championship with one win at the German Grand Prix at the Hockenheimring. 

In 1971, he competed in the premier 500cc class with a Kawasaki H1R. The H1R had poor road handling characteristics so, Simmonds had his H1R rebuilt around a Ken Sprayson-designed frame that greatly improved the machine's handling. He proved to be competitive by winning the preseason invitational 500cc Mettet Grand Prix then, finished second to Giacomo Agostini and the dominant MV Agusta at the Finnish Grand Prix followed by third places in Holland and Italy. Simmonds won his first 500cc class victory at the season ending Spanish Grand Prix at Jarama when Agostini sat out the race after already winning the championship. His victory in Spain also marked Kawasaki's first premier-class Grand Prix victory. Simmonds ended the season ranked 4th in the 500cc World Championship despite missing four rounds. In 1972, seven years after first his first appearance on the 125cc Kawasaki, Simmonds would race the bike to a remarkable third place at the Dutch TT.

Death
In 1972, while attending a non-championship motorcycle race at Rungis near Paris, Simmonds was killed in a fire caused by an exploding gas cylinder in a caravan owned by fellow racer Jack Findlay. Mistakenly thinking that Findlay was inside the caravan, Simmonds rushed to help just as the gas cylinder exploded, engulfing him in flames.

Grand Prix motorcycle racing results
Points system from 1950 to 1968:

Points system from 1969 onwards:

(key) (Races in bold indicate pole position; races in italics indicate fastest lap)

References

1939 births
1972 deaths
Sportspeople from London
English motorcycle racers
50cc World Championship riders
125cc World Championship riders
250cc World Championship riders
350cc World Championship riders
500cc World Championship riders
Isle of Man TT riders
Accidental deaths in France
125cc World Riders' Champions